is a Japanese voice actor and actor who is affiliated with Office Osawa.

He is known for roles such as Usami Akihiko in Junjou Romantica.

Filmography

Anime television
 Doraemon (1979 anime) (1999) (Buffalo, Caster)
 Mobile Suit Gundam Seed Destiny (2004) (Captain Baba in ep. 15,27-28)
 Doraemon (2005 anime) (2011) (Sommelier)

Unknown date
 Armitage: Dual-Matrix (2002) (Ross Sylibus)
 Bleach (2008) (Beast Sword; Kuzu Ryuu)
 Detective Conan (1999) (Nishimura)
 Ergo Proxy (Raul Creed)
 Guilty Gear X Drama CD (Sol Badguy)
 Guilty Gear XX Drama CD: Side Red/Black (Sol Badguy)
 Inuyasha (Ghost in ep. 97)
 Izumo: Takeki Tsurugi no Senki (Oonamuji)
 Junjou Romantica (2008) (Akihiko Usami)
 Kai Doh Maru (Sadamitsu Usuino)
 Kaikan Phrase (Director in ep.25; Live house owner in ep 8–9; Manager in ep. 19, 30, 38)
 Kotencotenco (Daimaoh, Golem, Monster, Turtle)
 Master Mosquiton '99 (Gentleman in ep. 16)
 Miscast Series Drama CDs (Shinichi Makimura)
 Monochrome Factor (Naitou in ep. 17)
 One Piece (Maynard)
 Outlaw Star (Prisoner in ep. 22)
 Samurai Shodown: Warriors Rage (Jin-emon Hanafusa)
 Sekai-ichi Hatsukoi (Akihiko Usami in ep. 6 season 2)
 Sexy Commando Gaiden: Sugoiyo! Masaru-san (Umaibou, Hattori)
 Shinkyoku Sōkai Polyphonica (Partesio Yugiri in ep. 8)
 Shinseikiden Mars (Professor Yokoyama)
 Strawberry Eggs (Seiko's Father)
 Summer (Master)
 Those Who Hunt Elves (Karei Pirate in ep. 1)
 You're Under Arrest (Bomb Squad Agent B in ep. 30; Voice on Tape in ep. 34)

Animated films
Harmony (2015)
One Piece: Stampede (2019) (Maynard)

Video games
Garou: Mark of the Wolves (1999) (Khushnood Butt, Tizoc)
Samurai Shodown: Warriors Rage (1999) (Jin-emon Hanafusa)
Guilty Gear X2 (2002) (Sol Badguy "Story mode only")
The King of Fighters 2003 (2003) (Tizoc)
Otogi 2: Immortal Warriors (2003) (Raikou)
The King of Fighters XI (2006) (Tizoc)
The King of Fighters XIV (2016) (King of Dinosaurs)
Pokémon Masters (2019) (Ghetsis)
The King of Fighters XV (2022) (King of Dinosaurs)

Drama CDs
 Miscast series (Shinichi Makimura)
 Renai Shinan! (Takazuki Honjou)
 Tsukiyo ni Koisuru Touzoku-san (Raishiru)
 Junjou Romantica (Usami Akihiko)

Japanese dub

Live-action
Arrow (Malcolm Merlyn / Dark Archer (John Barrowman))
Das Experiment (Eckert (Timo Dierkes))
Firewall (Liam (Nikolaj Coster-Waldau))
Freaky (Mr. Bernardi (Alan Ruck))
Grey's Anatomy (Dr. Tom Koracick (Greg Germann))
Jack Reacher (Emerson (David Oyelowo))

Animation
 The Lego Batman Movie (Superman)
 The Lego Movie 2: The Second Part (Superman)

References

External links
 
Hikaru Handa's blog 

Living people
Japanese male video game actors
Japanese male voice actors
People from Nakatsugawa, Gifu
1958 births
20th-century Japanese male actors
21st-century Japanese male actors